MTV Plus was a Greek free-to-air television channel, owned by Viacom. It was also distributed in Italy from 17 May 2010 until 1 March 2011, when it was replaced by MTV Music. On 1 November 2018 Nicknight Germany was replaced by the German relaunch of MTV Plus named “MTV+“, but later replaced by Comedy Central +1 on 1 March 2021.

History
The channel was launched in Greece on 18 October 2009. Its inauguration party was held in "Vogue" Club in Thessaloniki on 17 December 2009, with the guest appearance of British dance band Freemasons and some Greek bands such as C Real and Stavento. MTV+ was available on DTT in Thessaloniki, northern Greece. Its programming was similar to its sister channel MTV Greece. MTV+ used MTV's then global branding. The Greek version was closed down on 12 December 2011, replaced by Nickelodeon Plus.

Launch in Italy
The Greek channel started to be distributed as a free-to-air network on Italy DTT in May 2010 and on Sky Italia on 18 October 2010. It closed down on 1 March 2011, replaced by MTV Music.

Launch in Germany
The channel launched in German network in Germany in November 2018 on Nickelodeon Germany block. At Nick Germany, MTV+ aired from 8:15 pm - 5 am as a simulcast of the original MTV Channel but an hour later since 1 November 2018. At Nick Austria/Switzerland, MTV+ doesn't exist on the channel in Austria or Switzerland as it is yet to be announced therefore the Nicknight brand would still be used on those channels until 1 October 2021. On 1 March 2021 MTV+ was fully replaced by Comedy Central +1.

Logos

References

MTV channels
Defunct television channels in Italy
Defunct television channels in Greece
Television channels and stations established in 2009
Television channels and stations disestablished in 2011
2010 establishments in Italy
2011 disestablishments in Italy
2009 establishments in Greece
2011 disestablishments in Greece
Greek-language television stations
Music organizations based in Greece